In mathematical logic, the Paris–Harrington theorem states that a certain combinatorial principle in Ramsey theory, namely the strengthened finite Ramsey theorem, which is expressible in Peano arithmetic, is not provable in this system. The combinatorial principle is however provable in slightly stronger systems.

This result has been described by some (such as the editor of the Handbook of Mathematical Logic in the references below) as the first "natural" example of a true statement about the integers that could be stated in the language of arithmetic, but not proved in Peano arithmetic; it was already known that such statements existed by Gödel's first incompleteness theorem.

Strengthened finite Ramsey theorem
The strengthened finite Ramsey theorem is a statement about colorings and natural numbers and states that:
 For any positive integers n, k, m, such that m ≥ n, one can find N with the following property: if we color each of the n-element subsets of S = {1, 2, 3,..., N} with one of k colors, then we can find a subset Y of S with at least m elements, such that all n-element subsets of Y have the same color, and the number of elements of Y is at least the smallest element of Y.

Moreover, the strengthened finite Ramsey theorem can be deduced from the infinite Ramsey theorem in almost exactly the same way that the finite Ramsey theorem can be deduced from it, using a compactness argument (see the article on Ramsey's theorem for details). This proof can be carried out in second-order arithmetic.

The Paris–Harrington theorem states that the strengthened finite Ramsey theorem is not provable in Peano arithmetic.

Paris–Harrington theorem
Roughly speaking, Jeff Paris and Leo Harrington (1977) showed that the strengthened finite Ramsey theorem is unprovable in Peano arithmetic by showing that in Peano arithmetic it implies the consistency of Peano arithmetic itself. Since Peano arithmetic cannot prove its own consistency by Gödel's second incompleteness theorem, this shows that Peano arithmetic cannot prove the strengthened finite Ramsey theorem.

Alternatively, by adopting the reflection principle, for the arithmetic theory, for -sentences, which also implies the consistency of Peano arithmetic. It is provable in second-order arithmetic (or the far stronger Zermelo–Fraenkel set theory) and so is true in the standard model.

The smallest number N that satisfies the strengthened finite Ramsey theorem is then a computable function of n, m, k, but grows extremely fast. In particular it is not primitive recursive, but it is also far larger than standard examples of non-primitive recursive functions such as the Ackermann function. Its growth is so large that Peano arithmetic cannot prove it is defined everywhere, although Peano arithmetic easily proves that the Ackermann function is well defined.

See also
 Goodstein's theorem
 Kanamori–McAloon theorem
 Kruskal's tree theorem

References
 
 mathworld entry

External links
 A brief introduction to unprovability (contains a proof of the Paris–Harrington theorem) by Andrey Bovykin

Independence results
Theorems in the foundations of mathematics